A mesostic is a poem or other  text arranged so that a vertical phrase intersects lines of horizontal text. It is similar to an acrostic, but with the vertical phrase intersecting somewhere in the midst of the line, as opposed to the beginning of each line.

The practice of using index words to select pieces from a preexisting text was developed by Jackson Mac Low as "diastics". It was used extensively by the experimental composer John Cage (Walsh 2001).

There are two types of mesostic: fifty percent and one hundred percent. (See also the example below.)
 In a fifty-percent mesostic, according to Andrew Culver (John Cage's assistant), "Between any two [capitalized] letters, you can't have the second [letter]." 
 In a one-hundred-percent mesostic, "Between any two [capitalized] letters, you can't have either [letter]."

Below, an example of a one-hundred-percent mesostic:

         KITCHEN
 
   let us maKe
       of thIs
       modesT
         plaCe
     a room Holding
 tons of lovE
        (&, Naturally, much good food, too)

It qualifies as a one-hundred-percent mesostic because there is no k or i in the text between the capital K of line 1 and the capital I of line 2 –
   let us maKe
       of thIs
– no i or t between the capital I and T –
       of thIs
       modesT
– and so on.

See also
 Acrostic
 Backronym
 Word square

Notes

References

Cage, John. Musicage. Ed. Joan Retallack. Hanover & London: Wesleyan University Press, 1996.
Walsh, Michael Sunday, Jun. 24, 2001. "Sounds of Silence", Time Magazine.

Graphic poetry